The Leichtes Maschinengewehr Modell 1925 (shortened to Lmg 25) is a Swiss recoil operated light machine gun designed by Colonel Adolf Furrer of Waffenfabrik Bern in the 1920s and produced from 1925 to the 1960s.
It was the first machine gun in the Swiss Army that could be carried by a man. It takes the 7.5 mm Swiss Service cartridge from a 30-round box magazine and has a cyclic rate of fire of about 500 rounds-per-minute. In 1957, the LMG 25 was replaced by the Stgw 57-Assault rifle.

Overview

The Lmg 25 operates toggle-lock firing system, similar to the Luger P08 pistol.

The manufacturing company is the Waffenfabrik Bern, the designer was Colonel Adolf Furrer, the (then) director of the Waffenfabrik Bern. The Lmg 25 was lighter than the water-cooled machine guns of the time, but was also more complicated design, making it difficult to manufacture and raising its price.

In contrast to the Luger P08, the toggle lock of the Lmg 25 is not bent by a control curve, but by a support joint attached to the extension of the rear joint. The Lmg 25 is considered to be accurate but is susceptible to contamination due to large friction surfaces and low manufacturing tolerances as well as the large lateral opening of the breech block, which is necessary for the functioning of the knee joint, the closing flap of which opens automatically with the first shot.

The ammunition is fed in from the right by means of a magazine, the casings are ejected to the left. As a rule, the Lmg fires with pre-ignition, i.e. H. the shot is released when the locked system is still in advance. This prevents it from hitting the housing, which has the effect that the Lmg has a constant kickback, rather a backward thrust, which has a positive effect on the shot precision. Since the recoil of the cartridge and the return of the barrel have to be very precisely coordinated with one another, a changeover switch was installed to ensure that the weapon would function properly when the weapon was tilted sharply downwards.

The Lmg 25 was adopted by the Swiss Army to increase firepower of the light infantry units. In the fusilier groups, it was operated by 2 men and firing was commanded by team leader. The rest of the group was armed with a K31 Rifles and/or a submachine gun. In addition to the bipod (front support), the mount served as a target aid and enabled more precise firing groups at greater distances. The rear support attached to the rear of the butt was adjustable in length and could also be attached to the fore-end as a handle, which made shooting from a standing position easier. With a flab visor, the mounted Lmg 25 could also be used to fight airplanes. The carriage was only used sporadically after the Second World War.

The Lmg was also used in numerous forts. In order to use the weapon in fortifications, the front bipod was removed and a bracket was attached in its place, which enabled shooting from the openings.

In contrast to Mg 11, Lmg 25 was air-cooled. In the battle, a barrel change was planned after 6 magazines (180 rounds) in order not to overheat the barrel.
However, a change was made less frequently when only short series (5–8 rounds) were fired and the barrel was allowed to cool. Theoretically, the barrel change took 17 seconds.

Variants

 Lmg 25 Standardversion (standard version)
 Lmg 25, Spezialausführung für die Kavallerie mit Klappschaft (special version for the cavalry with folding stock): Instead of the fixed piston, this could be folded down for easier transport. The rear leg of the mount for the cavalry was also shorter.
 Lmg 25 mit Zielfernrohrschiene (with telescopic sight rail): A mounting rail for a telescopic sight was retrofitted to some Lmg 25.

Users
: Swiss Army

References

Machine guns of Switzerland
Light machine guns
Military equipment introduced in the 1920s